Church of Christ the King located in Xiamen, on Gulangyu Island, China, is a former cathedral and a World Heritage Site. It belongs to the Roman Catholic Diocese of Xiamen. 

The Christ the King Church was founded and built by a Spanish Dominican Bishop named Manuel Prat Pujoldevall in the year 1917. The church, along with 51 notable sites on Gulangyu island, was included by the 41st session of the World Heritage Committee held in Krakow, Poland, on 8 July 2017, as a World Heritage Site. The church celebrated its 100 years of existence. It still serves as the cathedral for the Roman Catholic Diocese of Xiamen.

References 

1917 establishments in China
Former cathedrals
Cathedrals in China
Roman Catholic churches in China
World Heritage Sites in China
Roman Catholic cathedrals in China